This article addresses recent emigration from Africa. See African diaspora for a general treatment of historic population movements. See recent African origin of modern humans for pre-historic human migration.

During the period of 1965 - 2021, an estimated 440,000 people per year emigrated from Africa; a total number of 17 million migrants within Africa was estimated for 2005.
The figure of 0.44 million African emigrants per year (corresponding to about 0.05% of the continent's total population) pales in comparison to the annual population growth of about 2.6%, indicating that only about 2% of Africa's population growth is compensated for by emigration.

Countries of Origin

North African 
During the 2000s, North Africa had been receiving large numbers of Sub-Saharan African migrants "in transit", predominantly from West Africa, who plan to enter Europe. 

An annual 22,000 illegal migrants took the route from either Tunisia or Libya to Lampedusa in the 2000–2005 period. This figure has decreased in 2006, but it has increased greatly as a result of the  2011 Tunisian revolution and the 2011 Libyan civil war.

Sub-Saharan 
In 2005, 10,000 West African migrants heading for Europe were stranded in the Mauritanian port of Nouadhibou, and 20,000 sub-Saharan African migrants were waiting for an opportunity to cross to Europe in the Spanish enclaves in North Africa.

For Sub-Saharan Africa, the World Bank report estimated a stock of 21.8 million (2.5% of population) emigrants vs. 17.7 million (2.1% of total population) immigrants.
63.0% of migration was estimated as taking place intra-regionally, while 24.8% of migration was to high-income OECD countries.
The top ten migration corridors were
1. Burkina Faso–Côte d'Ivoire, 
2. Zimbabwe–South Africa, 
3. Côte d'Ivoire–Burkina Faso, 
4. Uganda–Kenya, 
5. Eritrea–Sudan,
6. Mozambique–South Africa, 
7. Mali–Côte d'Ivoire, 
8. Democratic Republic of Congo–Rwanda, 
9. Lesotho–South Africa, 
10. Eritrea–Ethiopia.

 

The World Bank Migration and Remittances Factbook of 2011 gives separate regional summaries for Sub-Saharan Africa on one hand and the Middle East and North Africa on the other. For both regions, there is a surplus of emigrants, even though a substantial part of migration takes place within each region.

For the Middle East and North Africa, there was an estimated stock of 18.1 million (5.3% of population) emigrants vs. 12.0 million (3.5% of population) immigrants.
31.5% of migration took place intra-regional, 40.2% was to high-income OECD countries. 
The main migration corridors for North Africa were identified as Egypt–Saudi Arabia, Algeria–France
Egypt–Jordan,  Morocco–France, Morocco–Spain, Morocco–Italy,  and Egypt–Libya. The portion of refugees was estimated at 65.3% of migrants.

Destinations

Europe 

There is significant migration from Africa to Europe. 

As of 2007, there were an estimated seven million African migrants living in OECD countries. Of these, about half are of North African origin, mostly residing in France, Italy, Belgium, Spain and the Netherlands, while the other half are of Sub-Saharan African origin, present throughout Western Europe, with significant concentrations in Belgium, France, Italy, the Netherlands, Portugal, Spain and the United Kingdom. The rate of migration is projected to increase in the coming decades, according to Sir Paul Collier, a development economist.

The European Union Frontex agency's "Operation Hermes" is also monitoring the Mediterranean between North Africa and Italy. Due to increased border controls along the Mediterranean, there has been a shift of preferred migration routes towards Greece.

Approximate populations of African origin in Europe:
 Arabs and Berbers (including North African and Middle Eastern Arabs): approx. 5 million, mostly in France, Italy, the Netherlands, Austria, Belgium, Germany, United Kingdom, Sweden, Spain,  Norway, Denmark, Switzerland, Greece and Russia. (see Arabs in Europe)
 Sub-Equatorial Africans: approx. 5 million; mostly in Italy, France, the United Kingdom, Germany, Austria, Spain, the Netherlands and Portugal.
 Horn Africans: approx. 1 million, mostly Somalis and Eritreans, mostly in United Kingdom, Germany, Sweden, Austria, the Netherlands, Norway, Denmark, Finland
 Ethnic Europeans with colonial roots: approx. 8 million; mostly in France, United Kingdom, Greece, Romania and Belgium.
 North African Jews: approx. 500 thousands; mostly in France.

Asia 
Many young African students choose China as a destination, as the presence of Chinese industries and businesses in Africa has increased considerably in recent years.

North America 
African immigration to the United States has been comparatively slight, totaling around 3,183,104 individuals as of 2010.

Central and South America 
There is also a continuously rising amount of both legal and illegal immigration from Africa in Central and South American countries such as Brazil, Panama and Mexico.

Oceania 
In Australia, the number of immigrants from Africa has grown substantially since the 1990s, with most concentrated in Sydney, Melbourne and Perth. The largest of these African Australian populations is the South African community, and the Census in 2011 recorded 145,683 South Africa-born people in Australia. News anchor Anton Enus, the author J. M. Coetzee, and the singer Selwyn Pretorius are examples of local celebrities from this community. Also substantial is the 40,000-strong Egyptian Australian community, mostly concentrated in Sydney, the 30,000-strong Zimbabwean Australian community, and the 28,000-strong Mauritian Australian community.

Reasons for emigrating 

 Coloniality and underdevelopment
 Epistemic imbalance
 Conflict
 Depressed economies

Effects of emigration on Africa

"Brain drain" 
Especially physicians

Talent drain 
Especially sports talent.

Economic 

 Loss of educational investment due to brain drain
 Loss of labor force
 Dependence

But

 Remittances
 Trade

Risks and dangers of emigration

Difficulties faced by emigrants on the journey 

 Extortion
 Human trafficking
 Slavery
 Imprisonment
 Forced labor
 Rape
 Torture

Difficulties faced by emigrants at destination countries 

 Marginalization
 Racial discrimination
 Little economic opportunity
 Legal issues
 Police targeting
 Poor housing conditions
 Rights not always recognized

See also
 African immigration to the United States
 African immigration to Canada
 African immigration to Latin America
 African immigration to Europe
 African Australians
 African New Zealanders
 Migrants' African routes
 Intra-African migration
 Free movement protocol
 Threats facing illegal immigrants
 Work visa: required in some cases for economic emigration towards some countries

References

Bibliography
Arno Tanner, Emigration, Brain Drain and Development: the case of Sub-Saharan Africa,  2009, .
Belachew Gebrewold-Tochalo (ed.), Africa and Fortress Europe: threats and opportunities, Ashgate Publishing, Ltd., 2007, .
Hein de Haas, Irregular Migration from West Africa to the Maghreb and the European Union: An Overview of Recent Trends, International Organization for Migration, Geneva, 2008.

Emigration
African
Contemporary migrations

Africa